Jagmohan Kaur (16 April 1948 – 6 December 1997) was an Indian singer of Punjabi-language folk songs. She is known for her songs like Bapu Ve Add Hunni Ain, Ghara Wajjda, Gharoli Wajjdi.

Career
She also sang duets with her husband, singer K. Deep, and the duo is well known for their comedy characters Mai Mohno and Posti. Poodna is another notable song by the duo. She acted in few Punjabi films such as Daaj (1976), Mutiyar (1979) & Dushmani Di Agg (1990). She also sang as playback singer for many others, including Sukhi Parwar (1980) and Do Jattiyan.

Life 

Kaur was born on 16 April 1948 to father Gurbachan Singh and mother Parkash Kaur in Pathankot, Punjab. She was raised in her native village Boor Majra (now in Ropar district) and she received her primary education from the village school. Then she joined Khalsa High School, Kurali and then Arya Training School, Kharar and did J.B.T. (Junior Basic Training) and also worked as a teacher at Mani Majra near Chandigarh.

Later, learning music from Kanwar S. Mohinder Singh Bedi, she left her job and started singing.

In a program in Calcutta, she met singer K. Deep. They formed their own group and later got married on 2 February 1971; which was marriage made out of love. The couple had a son, Raja Kang and daughter billy kaur. Billy has stepped in to her parents creative footsteps as she is now a film producer, you can find her work on "Billy's Productions" on YouTube.

References 

Punjabi-language singers
Indian women folk singers
Indian folk singers
20th-century Indian singers
People from Rupnagar district
1948 births
1997 deaths
20th-century Indian women singers
Women musicians from Punjab, India
Singers from Pune